Hosehill Lake is a   Local Nature Reserve west of Reading in Berkshire. It is owned by West Berkshire Council and managed by  the Berkshire, Buckinghamshire and Oxfordshire Wildlife Trust.

Geography and site

To the east and south of the lake is meadowland. The eastern meadow is cut and then grazed by wild Exmoor ponies for a short period in the spring and autumn, and the south meadow is a butterfly meadow.

The site features a one-mile circular walk around the lake.

History

Hosehill Lake was given its nature reserve status in 1997 by Newbury District Council. Since it became a nature reserve, an island has been created in the lake, along with Tern Rafts, a Sand Martin Bank and the Butterfly Meadow.

In 2013 the management of the nature reserve was transferred from West Berkshire Council to the Berkshire, Buckinghamshire and Oxfordshire Wildlife Trust.

Fauna

The site has seen 168 different bird species. Some of the more common birds seen are listed here:

Birds

Little ringed plover
Great crested grebe
Bittern
Gadwall
Wigeon
Sand martin
House martin
Swallow
Common whitethroat
Chiffchaff
Hobby
Common tern
Black-headed Gull
Pochard
Goldeneye
Goosander
Northern shoveler

References

Parks and open spaces in Berkshire
West Berkshire District
Berkshire, Buckinghamshire and Oxfordshire Wildlife Trust
Nature reserves in Berkshire
Local Nature Reserves in Berkshire